Mad Love is a 2001 
period drama film written and directed by Vicente Aranda starring Pilar López de Ayala and Daniele Liotti. The plot follows the tragic fate of Queen Joanna of Castile, madly in love with an unfaithful husband, Philip the Handsome, Archduke of Austria. It is one of the several adaptations of Manuel Tamayo y Baus' 1855 historic drama The Madness of Love.

The film received three Goya awards, in the categories of Best Actress, Best Wardrobe, and Best Makeup and Hair.

Plot 

Tordesillas, 1554. Seventy-four years old, Queen Joanna of Castile, called Juana la Loca (Joanna the Madwoman), is still mourning the loss of her husband who died a half century before. Joanna remembers with emotion the man she loved passionately, but who brought her ruin. She does not fear death, she says, because death would allow her to be reunited with her husband. Their story goes back almost 60 years.

In 1496, Joanna, the third child of the Catholic Monarchs Ferdinand II of Aragon and Isabella I of Castile, is leaving Spain through the port of Laredo. She is headed to Flanders to marry the Archduke of Austria, Philip, nicknamed the Handsome, a man she has never laid eyes on. The marriage has been arranged for political purposes. Joanna's siblings and her mother, Queen Isabella, bid her farewell.

Once in Flanders, Joanna, young and inexperienced, is immediately smitten by her handsome fiancé. He is equally pleased with his beautiful bride and orders the marriage to take place at that very moment so they can consummate their marriage without any delay. Their union is initially a great success. The political alliance between their two countries has been consolidated and Joanna and Philip are very attracted to each other. With his good looks and bed manners, Philip completely captivates his wife. Their passionate love making soon produces results. Joanna has a daughter, followed shortly after by a son. 
This combination of love, lust and emotional dependency make the passionate Joanna deeply attached to her husband. Her love becomes consuming, but the intensity of her passion turns Philip away. He is a restless man who finds entertainment in going hunting and in the arms of other women. The deaths of Joanna's brother, the stillbirth of her brother's daughter, her older sister's death and her sister's son's death unexpectedly make her heir of the Castilian and Aragones crowns. However, she is not interested in government. Obsessed with her husband, Joanna surprises him in bed with a lover, who Joanna later successfully identifies as Inés de Brabante, one of the court ladies. In a fit of jealousy, Joanna cuts the hair of her rival. While Joanna despairs at her husband’s unfaithfulness, she receives further bad news. Her mother has died. Joanna thus becomes Queen of Castile and has to return to her kingdom. Her tantrums over her husband’s infidelities have made her start to become known as Joanna the Mad.
 
At the Castilian court in Burgos, the Queen is happily greeted by her subjects, but her marital life is still in turmoil. Philip is soon bewitched by the charms and spells of Aixa, a Moorish prostitute who uses her sexual attraction and black magic to secure Philip's favour. With this new lover, the King becomes noticeably indifferent toward his wife, which adds to her increasingly insane jealousy.

Against the background of this troubled marriage, there are two opposed political parties at court, one Flemish, the other Castilian. The conspiring Flemish usurpers are headed by Señor de Veyre, Philip's right-hand man. Their objective is to have Joanna declared insane and for Philip to take power away from her. Joanna has her own set of supporters, the loyal Castilian royalists, headed by the Admiral of Castile. The Admiral and the Queen's friend and confidant, Elvira, try unsuccessfully to rescue Juana from her marital obsessions.

However, it is not the government that is on the Queen's mind; she is fixated on retaining her husband’s love. To avoid any temptations at court, she hires only ugly-looking maids of honour to serve her, but in fact Aixa has been brought to court by Philip, passing as one of the court ladies under the name of Beatriz de Bobadilla. Unaware of this, the Queen relies on Beatriz to find a spell to help her retain her husband's love. Joanna is equally misguided in her attempt to regain Philip's attention by simulating a love affair with Captain Álvaro de Estúñiga, a close friend from her childhood. The Queen’s lack of control permits the manipulation of her enemies to have her declared incompetent to rule. The King, encouraged by Señor de Veyre, resolves to take the rule of the kingdom for himself and shove Joanna out of the way. He finds an unlikely ally in Joanna's own father, king Fernando, who has remarried and has no further interest in either the fate of his daughter or in the kingdom of Castile.

While her fate is decided at a court assembly, Joanna is able to successfully make her case, counting on the unquestionable support of her subjects. However, her powerful speech coincides with Philip falling gravely ill. Although she devotedly takes care of her husband, the doctors are unable to do anything for him. On his death bed, Philip apologises to his wife for his past excesses. After the death of her husband Joanna, heavily pregnant, takes on a long journey to the south of the country to bury her husband. She does not go far. Forced to stop to give birth to a daughter, Joanna never reaches her destination. Although she retains her title as queen, at the age of 28 she is locked as a madwoman in the castle of Tordesillas for the rest of her long life.

Philip's body was laid to rest in a nearby monastery, which Joanna was allowed to visit from time to time.

Cast

Production 
The film is a Enrique Cerezo PC, Pedro Costa PC, Production Group, Sogepaq and Take 2000 production.

Principal photography began on October 16, 2000 and ended on January 5, 2001.

The film is not an accurate portrayal of historical events, taking many liberties with the facts. Some character and plot devices are completely fictional, most notably the Moorish lover of Phillip. Some scenes were loosely based on the stage play The Madness of Love (Teatro del Príncipe, Madrid, 12 January 1855) by the dramatist Manuel Tamayo y Baus (1829–1898) that inspired several films with the same subject.

The film was shot in historical castles and places in Sigüenza, Talamanca de Jarama, the Monastery of Las Huelgas in Burgos, and Guimarães in Portugal, among other carefully chosen spots. The music for the film was composed by José Nieto, who took inspiration from the Burgos school of organists, such as Antonio de Cabezón, and La Folia Española, Luis de Milán, important 16th-century composer. The film ran into several problems even before it was released to the public. The Italian co-producers changed certain parts of the film for the Italian premiere, and Aranda had to threaten them with lawsuits. However, the version released in Spain and the United States was the original, as Aranda conceived it. The film was the Spanish entry of that year to the Academy Awards. It was picked up by Sony Pictures for distribution in the USA retitling the film in the American market as Mad Love. The same name had already been used by the 1995 Mad Love..

DVD release 
The film was released on DVD in the U.S. on January 21, 2003, in Spanish with English subtitles.

See also 
 List of Spanish films of 2001

Notes

References
 Majarín, Sara. Una vida de cine: Pasión, Utopía, Historia: Lecciones de Vicente Aranda. Editorial Zumaque S.L., 2013.

External links
 
 
 

2000s Spanish-language films
2001 films
2001 biographical drama films
2000s historical drama films
Films set in the 1490s
Films set in the 1550s
Spanish biographical drama films
Spanish historical drama films
Films directed by Vicente Aranda
Films shot in Madrid
Films set in Spain
Films set in Flanders
Cultural depictions of Isabella I of Castile
Ferdinand II of Aragon
Cultural depictions of Joanna of Castile
Love stories
2001 drama films
Portuguese historical drama films
2000s Spanish films
2000s Italian films
Enrique Cerezo PC films